Ali Abbasi (August 1961 – 30 July 2004) was a Pakistani-born Scottish television presenter, born in Karachi. He moved from Pakistan to Glasgow, in 1963, with his parents as a child and joined BBC Scotland as a travel presenter in the 1980s. He went on to publish numerous books and became a champion for the Gaelic language, appearing in the Gaelic children's series Dè a-nis? and the comedy series Air ais air an Ran Dan ("Back on the Ran Dan")

He joined BBC Scotland as a travel presenter in 1994 from Glasgow City Council, where he worked as an art gallery assistant. As well as presenting travel news at the BBC, Abbasi worked as an audio technician with outside broadcasts and radio cars.

Abbasi was appointed Gaelic reading champion by the Scottish Executive in 2003.

Abbasi died in Glasgow of lupus.

References

External links 
 Ali Abbasi: Your memories – BBC

1961 births
2004 deaths
Scottish television presenters
Scottish radio personalities
Deaths from lupus
Pakistani emigrants to Scotland
Pakistani television hosts
Pakistani radio presenters
Radio personalities from Karachi